Les Mason (born October 11, 1954) is an American politician. He has served as a Republican member for the 73rd district in the Kansas House of Representatives since 2014.

References

1954 births
Living people
Republican Party members of the Kansas House of Representatives
21st-century American politicians